The 1980 NCAA Division I baseball season, play of college baseball in the United States organized by the National Collegiate Athletic Association (NCAA) began in the spring of 1980.  The season progressed through the regular season and concluded with the 1980 College World Series.  The College World Series, held for the thirty fourth time in 1980, consisted of one team from each of eight regional competitions and was held in Omaha, Nebraska at Johnny Rosenblatt Stadium as a double-elimination tournament.  Arizona claimed the championship for the second time.

Conference winners
This is a partial list of conference champions from the 1980 season.  The NCAA sponsored regional competitions to determine the College World Series participants.  Seven regionals of four teams and one of six each competed in double-elimination tournaments, with the winners advancing to Omaha.  21 teams earned automatic bids by winning their conference championship while 13 teams earned at-large selections.

Conference standings
The following is an incomplete list of conference standings:

College World Series

The 1980 season marked the thirty fourth NCAA Baseball Tournament, which culminated with the eight team College World Series.  The College World Series was held in Omaha, Nebraska.  The eight teams played a double-elimination format, with Arizona claiming their second championship with a 5–3 win over Hawaii in the final.

Award winners

All-America team

References